Militant use of children in Sri Lanka has been an internationally recognized problem since the inception of the Sri Lankan civil war in 1983. The primary recruiters of under the age of 18 children are the rebel LTTE movement and the Karuna group, a break-away faction of the LTTE working with Sri Lanka Forces. Human Rights Watch criticized that threats and intimidation were used by the LTTE to force Tamil families in Sri Lanka to furnish children for military duty. When families reject, their children are sometimes kidnapped at night from their homes or forced recruited while walking to school. Parents who refuse to allow their children to be recruited suffer retaliation by the Tamil Tigers, which may include violence or detention.

LTTE recruitment
Before 2007 the LTTE was accused of recruiting thousands of children into their ranks. The LTTE has been accused of knowingly recruiting and using child soldiers as front-line troops. Amid international pressure, LTTE announced in July 2003 that it would stop conscripting child soldiers, but both UNICEF and HRW have accused it of reneging on its promises, and of conscripting Tamil children orphaned by the tsunami. LTTE  created 'orphanages' for children displaced in the fighting where they underwent indoctrination and recruitment. The Sirasu Puli (Leopard Brigade) was said to be composed entirely of children from these orphanages. UNICEF claimed that LTTE recruited at least 40 children orphaned by the tsunami. However, from the beginning of 2007 LTTE agreed to release all of the recruits under the age of 18. Human Rights Watch and Amnesty accused LTTE of re-recruiting Karuna's former cadres including child soldiers after Karuna's defection from the LTTE in 2004.The LTTE had threatened families that they would take children by force if they did not return, or that they would take other children or parents in their stead.

The LTTE routinely visited Tamil homes to inform parents that they must provide a child for the "movement." Families that resist were harassed and threatened. Some families  have been told by the LTTE that:

Hence, many cases of child recruitment went unreported due to increased insecurity and additional pressures by LTTE not to report. According to Human Rights Watch, the recruited child soldiers were subjected to rigorous training. One girl, recruited at age fifteen, described the training as follows. 

Child soldiers who made mistakes in training or tried to escape the LTTE were met with strict punishments. Manchula, a child soldier, described a punishment she received as follows:

Nirmala, a girl recruited at age fourteen, recounted how children were punished by LTTE for trying to escape:

2007
According to UNICEF, between November 1, 2006 and August 31, 2007, 262 children were recruited by the LTTE; this figure includes 32 children who were rerecruited after being released.  This number shows a significant decrease in recruitment as compared to the previous 12-month period, which saw the LTTE recruit 756 children, of whom 97 were rerecruits.
The LTTE promised that it would release all of the recruits under the age of 18 before the end of the year. On 18 June 2007, the LTTE released 135 children under the age of 18. On 22 October 2007, UNICEF claimed that at least 506 child recruits (under the age of 18) still remained under the LTTE. UNICEF further noted that there had been a significant drop in recruitment of children by the LTTE. Furthermore, a report released by the LTTE's Child Protection Authority (CPA) in 2008 reported that fewer than 40 child soldiers, under the age of 18, still remained in their forces. In January 2008, the LTTE claimed that they had stopped child recruitment. 
Despite the LTTE claims the LTTE began increasing forced recruitment of children as the war neared its end recruiting children as young as 11 and threatening to shoot children that retreated. However many managed to run away under fire from the LTTE and according to the UNICEF  a total of 594 children aged between 12 and 18 years surrendered to armed forces during the end of the war.

TMVP Paramilitary Recruitment and State Involvement
Since the defection of the LTTE Eastern Commander Colonel Karuna to the Government of Sri Lanka in 2004, the TMVP known as the Karuna Group (A Tamil paramilitary group which supports the Sri Lankan government), has been held responsible for the abduction of children according to UNICEF and Human Rights Watch. Allan Rock, who is a special advisor to the UN Special Rapporteur for Children and Armed Conflict Dr. Radhika Coomaraswamy, alleged that government forces had forcibly rounded up young Tamil children to fight with Col Karuna's group. Colonel Karuna, while categorically denying any involvement in abducting children, questioned Rock's impartiality, stating that Allan Rock is a former politician with links to the LTTE who had previously helped the LTTE in Canada. Civilians have also complained that the TMVP is continuing to abduct children, including some in their early teens, for use as soldiers. Allan Rock vowed that he had "credible evidence" for the accusations. The government of Sri Lanka and the Government newspaper Daily News asked Mr. Rock to produce substantive proof that Sri Lankan soldiers collaborated in child soldier recruitment. 2008 report by the United Nations stated that TMVP continued to recruit children. The UN further noted that children have been abducted in places like Internally Displaced Persons (IDP) camps in Sri Lanka.

See also
Military use of children
Government of Sri Lanka
LTTE
Colonel Karuna

References

Liberation Tigers of Tamil Eelam
Human rights abuses in Sri Lanka
Military sociology
Child labour
Sri Lanka
Human rights abuses